The Schwarzbach railway was a  Saxon narrow-gauge railway in  Saxon Switzerland. It began in Goßdorf-Kohlmühle station on the Sebnitz Valley railway and ran along the valley of the Schwarzbach to Hohnstein.

Overview
The line was opened in 1897 and closed and dismantled in 1951 in order to supply material for the Berlin Outer Ring.

Since 1995 the Schwarzbachbahn Society has endeavoured to rebuild a section of the line and run it as a museum railway. The former station ins Lohsdorf has been redecorated and new tracks laid there. The society has its headquarters in the station building at Goßdorf-Kohlmühle.

Sources 
 Wolfram Wagner, Wolfgang König: Die Geschichte der Schmalspurbahn Goßdorf-Kohlmühle–Hohnstein 1897–1951. 2. überarbeitete Auflage. Deutscher Modelleisenbahnverband der DDR, Dresden 1984.
 Karlheinz Uhlemann: Die ehemalige Schmalspurbahn Goßdorf-Kohlmühle–Hohnstein. In: Mitteilungen des Landesvereins Sächsischer Heimatschutz Heft 3/2007, S. 39–44.
 Matthias Hengst: Frühere sächsische Schmalspurbahnen nördlich der Elbe. Bufe-Fachbuch-Verlag, Egglham 1995, .
 Erich Preuß, Reiner Preuß: Schmalspurbahnen in Sachsen. transpress Verlag, Stuttgart 1998, .
 Rainer Preuß, Erich Preuß: Schmalspurbahnen der Oberlausitz. transpress VEB Verlag für Verkehrswesen, Berlin 1980, ohne ISBN.
 Klaus Kieper, Rainer Preuß: Schmalspurbahnarchiv. transpress VEB Verlag für Verkehrswesen, Berlin 1980, ohne ISBN.
 Rolf Böhm: Wanderkarte der Sächsischen Schweiz – Brand-Hohnstein 1:10.000. Verlag Rolf Böhm, Bad Schandau, 1993 (2. Auflage 2000).

References

External links 

 Homepage of the Schwarzbachbahn Society
 Route description at www.sachsenschiene.de
 Route description at www.lokomotive.de
 Photos of its present condition at www.stillgelegt.de

Railway lines in Saxony
Hohnstein
750 mm gauge railways in Germany
Transport in Saxon Switzerland